The 1500 meters distance for men in the 2014–15 ISU Speed Skating World Cup was contested over six races on six occasions, out of a total of seven World Cup occasions for the season, with the first occasion taking place in Obihiro, Japan, on 14–16 November 2014, and the final occasion taking place in Erfurt, Germany, on 21–22 March 2015.

The defending champion was Koen Verweij of the Netherlands. Denny Morrison of Canada won the cup. Verweij had to settle for 11th place.

Top three

Race medallists

Standings 
Standings as of 22 March 2015.

References 

 
Men 1500